Julie Rousseau (born 1964 or 1965) was the head coach of the WNBA team Los Angeles Sparks from 1997 to 1998. Outside of the WNBA, Rousseau was a coach of multiple NCAA teams including the Stanford Cardinal and Pepperdine Waves. She also was an assistant coach for the gold winning United States women's national basketball team during the      2009 Summer Universiade.

Early life and education
Rousseau was born in Los Angeles, California and played college basketball at the University of California, Irvine in 1983. Rousseau graduated from the California State University, Los Angeles with a Bachelor of Education in 1991, a Master of Psychology from Pepperdine University in 2012. and a PhD in Human Systems Engineering from Arizona State University in 2019

Career
Rousseau began her coaching career at George Washington Preparatory High School. She was the head coach of the girls basketball team for George Washington Prep from 1992 to 1997. Afterwards, she briefly coached in the WNBA starting as an assistant coach for the Los Angeles Sparks in 1997. She later became the Sparks's interim head coach and named head coach at the end of 1997. Rousseau held her position of head coach of the Sparks until the summer of 1998. With the Sparks, Rousseau had 17 wins and 20 losses.

After leaving the WNBA, Rousseau began working in the NCAA. Rousseau was the assistant coach for the Stanford Cardinal women's basketball from 2000 to 2004. Upon leaving the Cardinal, Rousseau was the head coach of the Pepperdine Waves women's basketball team from 2004 to 2013. With the Waves, she had 123 wins and 144 losses.

After leaving the Waves, she worked as a sports commentator for Pac-12 Network before becoming an assistant coach for the Nevada Wolf Pack women's basketball team in July 2014. Rousseau remained with the Wolf Pack until May 2015 to pursue further post-secondary education. Outside of the NCAA, Rousseau was an assistant coach of the United States women's national basketball team that won gold at the 2009 Summer Universiade.

References

1960s births
Living people
Los Angeles Sparks head coaches
Stanford Cardinal women's basketball coaches
Pepperdine Waves women's basketball coaches
Nevada Wolf Pack women's basketball coaches
United States women's national basketball team coaches